Santiago of the Seas is an American computer-animated children's television series created by Niki Lopez, Leslie Valdes, and Valerie Walsh Valdes that premiered on Nickelodeon on October 9, 2020. The series features the voices of Kevin Chacon, Justice Quiroz, Alyssa Cheatham, and Valentino Cortes.

On February 18, 2021, the series was renewed for a second season, which premiered on January 7, 2022.

Premise
The show follows Santiago, an 8-year-old pirate, and his crew as they embark on rescues, uncover hidden treasures and keeps the Caribbean high seas safe. The show is infused with Spanish language and Latino-Caribbean culture and curriculum.

Characters

Main 
 Santiago Montes (voiced by Kevin Chacon in season one, Valentino Cortes in season two) an 8-year old pirate, and leader of his crew.
 Tomás (voiced by Justice Quiroz) Santiago's cousin and sidekick whose guitar makes special sonic sounds.
 Lorelai (voiced by Alyssa Cheatham) Santiago's best friend and other sidekick who can turn into a mermaid using a magic bracelet.

Villains 
 Bonnie Bones (voiced by Kyndra Sanchez)
 Sir Butterscotch (voiced by John Leguizamo in season one, Eric Lopez in season two)
 Pepito (voiced by Robin de Jesús)

Release 
The series premiered on October 9, 2020 on Nickelodeon and on Nick Jr. internationally.

Episodes

Series overview

Season 1 (2020–21)

Season 2 (2022–23)

Reception

Critical response 
The series received a positive reception. Emily Ashby of Common Sense Media called the series "exceptional" and praised it for celebrating kindness and courage. She also stated that the series is "visually appealing" and argued that the dedication of the characters to work together and their personalities make for a "feel-good viewing." She further praised the series for exposing preschoolers to the Spanish language through "useful terms that are easily learned" in the context of the series.

Awards and nominations

References

External links 
 
 

2020s American animated television series
2020s American children's television series
2020s Nickelodeon original programming
2020 American television series debuts
American children's animated action television series
American children's animated adventure television series
American computer-animated television series
American preschool education television series
English-language television shows
Nick Jr. original programming
Animated television series about children
Television series about pirates
Fictional Hispanic and Latino American people
Hispanic and Latino American television
Spanish-language education television programming
Animated preschool education television series
2020s preschool education television series